Azam Tariq may refer to:

 Azam Tariq (Sipah-e-Sahaba Pakistan), founding member of Sipah-e-Sahaba Pakistan
 Azam Tariq (Tehrik-i-Taliban Pakistan), spokesperson of Tehrik-i-Taliban Pakistan